The area of Norwich between the Salhouse and Plumstead roads (outside of the outer ring road) was originally the Cavalry Training Ground and then became the Royal Flying Corps Mousehold Heath aerodrome where Boulton Paul, among other manufacturers, passed over the aircraft they made for service. It was sometimes known as Norwich aerodrome by the Royal Flying Corps before it became Royal Air Force Mousehold Heath in April 1918.

After the First World War, Boulton and Paul continued to use the site. The Norwich & Norfolk Aero Club was formed at the airfield in 1927 which then became the first Norwich Airport in 1933.  The airfield fell into disuse during the Second World War and has now mostly been redeveloped for housing.

History

The following squadrons and units were posted here at some point:

No. 3 Aircraft Acceptance Park was formed at the aerodrome on 22 March 1917 originally as the Norwich Aircraft Acceptance Park later designated the No. 3 (Norwich) Aircraft Acceptance Park and on 26 July 1919 became the Norwich Storage Park. The park accepted aircraft into service from local manufacturers Boulton Paul, Mann Egerton, Portholme and Ransome Simms & Jeffries.
No. 3 Group headquarters was located at Mousehold Heath between July and November 1919.

Current use

Several original buildings remain in industrial use, including hangars and other buildings on the Salhouse Industrial Estate.  Part of the flying field survives as the playing field for the Open Academy, formerly Heartsease High School.

See also
Royal Air Force station
List of former Royal Air Force stations
Mousehold Heath

References

Citations

External links
UK Airfields & Airports article on Mousehold

Bibliography
 

Royal Air Force stations in Norfolk
Royal Air Force stations of World War II in the United Kingdom